Somebody's Mother's Chocolate Sauce, LLC is a gourmet chocolate sauce company based in Houston, Texas. The company was founded by Lynn Lasher and her three children in April 2005.

History
Somebody's Mother's Chocolate Sauce was exhibited at NASFT's 2009-2012 Summer Fancy Food Shows.

The company launched a contest in March 2011 that encouraged people to donate to USA Cares and to submit a story about an important person in their lives. The winners of the best stories, received $500 gift cards.

Products
Somebody's Mother's Chocolate Sauce makes gluten-free and kosher dessert sauces in jars. It also carries gift packages in their online store.

Awards and Critical Reception
In 2011, Somebody's Mother's Chocolate Sauce was named one of the top 12 Artisan Producers for Quality & Innovation in The Nibble's 2011 Artisan Food Awards.

The chocolate sauce has been reviewed and featured in various newspapers and food blogs.

See also
 List of dessert sauces

References

External links
 Official Somebody's Mother's Chocolate Sauce Website

American chocolate companies
American companies established in 2005
Dessert sauces
Food and drink companies established in 2005